Sardar Abdul Rehman Baloch alias Rehman Dakait was a Pakistani gangster based in Karachi's Lyari neighbourhood who formed the Peoples' Aman Committee. In urban Karachi, he is a mythical figure from the feared but not talked about underworld. Dakait was a cousin of Sardar Uzair Jan Baloch, who is in the custody of law enforcement.

Early life 
Baloch was born in 1980 to Dad Muhammad and Khadija Bibi. His father, Dad Muhammad, and paternal uncle, Sheru, had been involved in drug smuggling since 1964. They were challenged by Kala Nag, who was later killed in a police encounter.

Baloch started peddling drugs from a young age. He is claimed to have stabbed a man when he was just 13. In 1995, some also claim he murdered his mother. It is speculated that she was involved with a rival gang member.

After Haji Laloo's arrest in 2001, Baloch replaced him as the chief of Laloo's gang.

Killing
Dakait was killed in a shootout with Karachi police, on 9 August 2009. Zulfiqar Mirza gave a statement in which he said that he was the one who killed Rehman Dakait but at the same moment he said that he felt bad for this action.
Zulfiqar Mirza also stated that he is responsible for this action.

See also
 Peoples' Aman Committee

References 

Murdered Pakistani gangsters
Baloch people
Pakistani extortionists
People from Lyari Town
Pakistani gangsters